Mycteria  is a genus of large tropical storks  with representatives in the Americas, east  Africa and southern and southeastern Asia. Two species have "ibis" in their scientific or old common names, but they are not related to these birds and simply look more similar to an ibis than do other storks.

The Mycteria  storks are large birds, typically around 90–100 cm in length with a 150 cm wingspan. The body plumage is mainly white in all the species, with black in the flight feathers of the wings. The Old World species have a bright yellow bill, red or yellow  bare facial skin and red legs, but these parts are much duller in the wood stork of tropical America. Juvenile birds are a duller version of the adult, generally browner, and with a paler bill.

They are gregarious broad-winged soaring birds that fly with the neck outstretched and legs extended. They are resident breeders in lowland wetlands with trees in which they build large stick nests. Most species of Mycteria are diurnal, except for M. americana, which may be nocturnal.

These storks walk slowly and steadily in shallow open wetlands seeking their prey, which, like that of most of their relatives, consists of fish, frogs and large insects.

Distribution 
The genus Mycteria inhabits all tropical regions of the Earth. M. americana is distributed throughout the American continent. M. ibis lives in tropical Africa. M. leucocephala is present in eastern Pakistan and India to Vietnam, and M. cinerea in Cambodia and Vietnam to Sumatra and Java.

Taxonomy
The genus Mycteria was introduced in 1758 by the Swedish naturalist Carl Linnaeus in the tenth edition of his Systema Naturae for the wood stork (Mycteria americana) which is therefore now the type species. The genus name is from the Ancient Greek μυκτηρ/muktēr meaning "snout" or "nose".

Species 
The genus contains four species.

Fossils
Two prehistoric relatives of the wood stork have been described from fossils:

 Mycteria milleri (Miller's stork) (Valentine Middle Miocene of Cherry County, US) - formerly Dissourodes
 Mycteria wetmorei (Wetmore's stork) (Late Pleistocene of west and southeast US, and Cuba)

The latter seems to have been a larger sister species of the wood stork, which it replaced in prehistoric North America.

Late Miocene tarsometatarsus fragments (Ituzaingó Formation at Paraná, Argentina) are somewhat similar to Mycteria but still distinct enough to be probably a distinct genus, especially considering their age. A Late Pleistocene distal radius from San Josecito Cavern (Mexico) may belong in this genus or in Ciconia. A "ciconiiform" fossil fragment from the Touro Passo Formation found at Arroio Touro Passo (Rio Grande do Sul, Brazil) might be of the living species M. americana; it is at most of Late Pleistocene age, a few ten thousands of years.

References

Further reading

 Grimmett, Richard; Inskipp, Carol, Inskipp, Tim & Byers, Clive (1999): Birds of India, Pakistan, Nepal, Bangladesh, Bhutan, Sri Lanka, and the Maldives. Princeton University Press, Princeton, N.J. 
 Hilty, Steven L. (2003): Birds of Venezuela. Christopher Helm, London. 

 
Bird genera